The 2007 Eneco Tour road cycling race took place from 22 to 29 August. The third edition of the Eneco Tour covered parts of the Netherlands and Belgium. Instead of 23 teams like before, only 21 teams take part in the race this year. Of the 20 UCI ProTour teams, only  chose not to take part.
The teams Chocolade Jacques–Topsport Vlaanderen and Skil–Shimano were each given a wild card.

Several cities that have been start or finish locations already the previous years appear again in the schedule, e.g. Hasselt, Beek, Landgraaf, Sittard and Geleen were already part of the 2006 route. A major difference in the schedule is that the long time trial will now take place on the last day of the competition.

Schedule

Stages

22-08-2007: Hasselt, 5.1 km. (ITT)

23-08-2007: Waremme-Eupen, 189.5 km.

24-08-2007: Antwerp-Knokke-Heist, 199.1 km. 

  Wouter Weylandt finished third but was relegated due to irregular sprint.

25-08-2007: Knokke-Heist-Putte, 170.8 km.

26-08-2007: Maldegem-Terneuzen, 182.7 km.

27-08-2007: Terneuzen-Nieuwegein, 179.9 km.

28-08-2007: Beek-Landgraaf, 177.4 km.

29-08-2007: Sittard-Geleen, 29.6 km. (ITT)

General classification
The leader of the general classification (ENECO Energie leiderstrui) wears a red jersey.

Last updated: August 29, 2007

Points Classification
The leader of the points classification (Lotto Puntenklassement) wears a white jersey.

Last updated: August 27, 2007

Best Team

Jersey progress

Withdrawals
All teams were allowed to start with 8 riders. For 21 teams this would create a starting field of 168 riders. As a result, only 164 riders were on the official starting list.

UCI ProTour Points
The Eneco Tour 2007 is part of the UCI ProTour and so the riders can earn UCI ProTour Points. Below is states which riders won points and where. Because the Eneco Tour 2006 is a smaller stage race the points given are 3, 2 and 1 for the first three in each stage result. At the end of the tour, the top 10 in the standings receive points accorded as follows: 50, 40, 35, 30, 25, 20, 15, 10, 5 and 2.

Stage Results

Overall Result

Summary

External links
Race website

References



2007 UCI ProTour
2007
2007 in Belgian sport
2007 in Dutch sport